Gingold is a Yiddish word and surname which may refer to:

 Alfred Gingold, an American freelance writer
 Chaim Gingold (born 1980), computer game designer
 Hermione Gingold (1897-1987), British actress
 Josef Gingold (1909-1995), Belarusian-Jewish violinist and teacher
 Kurt Gingold (1929–1997), Austrian-American scientific translator
 Michael Gingold, American screenwriter and journalist
 Peter Gingold (1916-2006), German Resistance figure and Holocaust survivor

It may also refer to:
 15019 Gingold, a main-belt asteroid discovered in 1998
 "Gingold", the name of a fictitious brand of soda pop that DC Comics superhero Elongated Man drinks.

See also 
 Feingold, Finegold (same meaning)

Yiddish words and phrases
Jewish surnames
Germanic-language surnames
Yiddish-language surnames
Surnames of Belarusian origin
Surnames of Russian origin